Taupō is a town in the centre of the North Island of New Zealand.

Taupō or Taupo may also refer to:

New Zealand
 Lake Taupō, the lake that the town of Taupō sits on
 Taupō Bay, a bay on Lake Taupō
 Taupō Volcano, a volcano in the centre of New Zealand's North Island
 Taupō Caldera, a caldera formed by Taupō Volcano
 Taupo Airport, a small airport South of the town of Taupō
 Taupō District, a District, or territorial authority, of New Zealand
 Taupō (New Zealand electorate), a New Zealand parliamentary electorate division
 HMNZS Taupo, a New Zealand Navy vessel

Other uses
 Taupo or Taupou (Somoan culture), the daughter of the high chief of a Samoan Village

See also
 
 

 Taupoa, an archaic classification for the Epeus spider
 Taupe, a dark brown color